The Paimpol–Bréhat tidal farm is an 8 MW tidal turbine demonstration farm off Île-de-Bréhat near Paimpol, France.  It is developed by Électricité de France (EdF).  The project was initiated in 2004 and work began in 2008.

The tidal farm will consist of four turbines, 2 MW each. Turbines are assembled by DCNS and installed by OpenHydro.  The first turbine was installed in August 2011.  According to EdF, when completed it will be the world's largest tidal array and the world's first grid-connected tidal energy farm.

The two turbines were retrieved from the seabed in 2017 for replacement of components that threatened the turbine's resistance to corrosion. These turbines were never redeployed and the project was subsequently cancelled by EdF in 2018.

References

Energy infrastructure completed in 2012
Tidal power stations in France
Électricité de France
21st-century architecture in France